This is a list of the recorders of the British colonies of Penang (also known as Prince of Wales Island), Malacca, and Singapore between 1808 and 1867.

The position of recorder of Penang's Court of Judicature was established concurrently with the Court of Judicature by the Charter of Justice, created by letters patent dated 25 March 1807. The court opened on 31 May 1808. The recorder presided over the Court of Judicature.

On 27 November 1826, a unified court of judicature for Prince of Wales Island, Singapore, and Malacca was created, pursuant to the Second Charter of Justice, for which John Thomas Claridge was the first recorder. The unified court extended the jurisdiction of the original court of judicature for Penang to Singapore and Malacca.

Under the Second Charter, the recorder's office was in Penang and he was to go on circuit to courts of the other colonies. Recorders typically received higher salaries than British colonial governors in the Straits Settlements and were also knighted, apparently as a matter of course, upon their appointment. This led to some discord between the governors and the recorders, who were both members of the colonial courts.

From 1867 the position of recorder was replaced by the chief justice of the Straits Settlements.

Recorders of Penang 

 1808–1816 Sir Edmond Stanley
 1817 Sir George Andrew Cooper
 1817–1824 Sir Ralph Rice
 1824 Sir Francis Souper Bayley
 1856–1866 Sir Peter Benson Maxwell
 1866–1867 Sir William Hackett

Recorders of Penang, Singapore, Malacca

 1827–1829 Sir John Thomas Claridge
 1833–1835 Sir Benjamin Heath Malkin
 1835–1836 Sir Edward John Gambier
 1836–1847 Sir William Norris
 1847–1850 Sir Christopher Rawlinson
 1850–1855 Sir William Jeffcott

Recorders of Singapore, Malacca

 1856–1866 Sir Richard Bolton McCausland
 1866–1867 Sir Peter Benson Maxwell

Recorder of Singapore

 1866–1867 Sir Peter Benson Maxwell

References

Sources
 
 
 

Lists of judges
Singaporean judges
British colonial judges in Asia
British Empire-related lists
Lists of office-holders in the British Empire